The Old Brooklyn Fire Headquarters is a historic building located at 365-67 Jay Street near Willoughby Street in Downtown Brooklyn,  New York City. Designed by Frank Freeman in the Richardsonian Romanesque Revival style and built in 1892 for the Brooklyn Fire Department, it was used as a fire station until the 1970s, after which it was converted into residential apartments. The building, described as "one of New York's best and most striking architectural compositions", was made a New York City landmark in 1966, and listed on the National Register of Historic Places in 1972.

History

Construction and use 
Around 1890, the Brooklyn Fire Department began planning for the construction of a new fire headquarters with a tall lookout tower. A plot of land was eventually purchased for the purpose on Jay Street, adjacent to the quarters of Engine Company 17, for $15,000. At this point, a dispute arose as to the choice of architect. Fire Commissioner John Ennis favored a protégé of local Democratic Party leader Hugh "Boss" McLaughlin, but the city works commissioner, John P. Adams, preferred another firm. Eventually, a compromise candidate was selected—Frank Freeman, a leading exponent of the Richardsonian Romanesque style, who had recently completed the Thomas Jefferson Association Building for the Kings County Democrats.

The new building was completed in 1892, although the fire department did not occupy the building until March 1894. Though originally intended as the department's headquarters, it served in this role for only six years, when the City of Brooklyn was incorporated as a borough into the City of New York, after which the building became "simply, the most splendid neighborhood firehouse in Greater New York."

The building was retained as a firehouse by the New York City Fire Department until the 1970s, serving as the home of various units including Ladder 110 and 118, Engine 207, and from 1947 to 1971, Battalion 31. In the 1930s, it also served as the HQ of Searchlight 2, a unit which utilized a Packard sedan modified to carry searchlights, in an era before fire engines were fitted with their own searchlights. In 1966, the building was designated as a New York City landmark, and in 1972, it was listed on the National Register of Historic Places.

Subsequent use 

After the Fire Department vacated the premises, it was leased for a time by Polytechnic University. In 1987, the Board of Estimate proposed a conversion of the then-vacant building into 18 apartments for low-income and elderly people with the MetroTech Center. The plan was met with considerable resistance in some quarters. However, the conversion subsequently went ahead in 1989, partly on the grounds that continued use would prevent the building from falling into decay.

The Black United Fund of New York took over the building from the 1990s until 2005, when ownership returned to the New York City Department of Housing Preservation and Development. However, the deterioration continued and, in 2006, the New York Times said that the building had a "musty, neglected air" and was in need of maintenance, with parts of its roofing having disintegrated.

In 2008, the Pratt Area Community Council received a budget allocation of $400,000 toward the renovation of the Jay Street firehouse. Nomad Architecture subsequently started a project to convert the building to residential use. The project began in spring 2011 and was completed in 2015.

Description

Exterior 
These two elements are separated by a slender, semicircular turret with a conical roof which rises the full height of the building, while two similar turrets on each wing lend the facade a strong sense of unity. Both elements contain a pyramid-shaped, red-tiled roof.

The facade consists of three architectural bays. The leftmost bay includes the watchtower and contains two narrow windows on the second through fifth floors. The two bays on the right side, separated by brick pilasters, comprise the main building and each include one wide window on the second through fourth floors. On the ground floor, serving as the main entrance, is "one of the boldest and most mellifluously carved arches" in Brooklyn, through which the fire engines once drove. A sign with the words "Fire Headquarters" was hung above the arch. A second, receding arch is located on the opposite side of the building, high in the tower.

Decorative studs above the tower arch and cylindrical holes around the tops of the turrets enhance the overall sense of boldness. The building is constructed of orange brick with terra cotta detailing, held up by granite with red sandstone trim, while the pyramidal roof is tiled in red and trimmed with copper. The overall color scheme has been characterized as "both subtle and ingenious." Overall, the building is an example of the New York Branch of the Chicago architectural school.

Interior 
In its original layout, the main entrance at ground level was located to the left of the garages, and consisted of oak doors that opened into the lobby. Within the lobby was an elevator with wrought iron doors; its machine room was in the basement. Also at ground level, the garages had space for motor vehicles and stables for horses that were still used at the time. On the second floor were the offices of the Commissioner and the rest of the chiefs, as well as administrative offices. The third floor contained archives and supply rooms, as well as a room to detain firefighters who had violated regulations but had not yet appeared before the Commissioner. The fourth floor was intended for training firefighters, especially new firefighters, while the fifth floor was given over entirely to the telegraph alarm system, "with its miles of copper wire stretching out over Brooklyn." All floors, except the ground floor, contained wood finishes, mainly old oak.

Critical reception 
The Brooklyn Fire Headquarters has received high praise from critics. The Landmark Preservation Commission's designation report described it as "one of New York's best and most striking architectural compositions" and "one of the finest buildings in Brooklyn." Architecture critic Francis Morrone has characterized it as "simply, the most splendid neighborhood firehouse in Greater New York." The "exuberant and lusty" design is widely considered to be a masterpiece of the Richardsonian Romanesque style.

See also
List of New York City Landmarks
National Register of Historic Places listings in New York County, New York

References
Notes

Bibliography
 Morrone, Francis; Iska, James (2001): An Architectural Guidebook to Brooklyn, Gibbs Smith, .
 Schneiderman, Joseph (2002): The Firefighting Buff's Guide To New York City: The Five Borough, Five Alarm Reference To The Second Homes of New York's Bravest, IUniverse, pp. 31–32, .

External links

Government buildings on the National Register of Historic Places in New York City
Fire stations completed in 1892
Frank Freeman buildings
Richardsonian Romanesque architecture in New York City
Residential buildings in Brooklyn
Defunct fire stations in New York (state)
Fire stations on the National Register of Historic Places in New York (state)
Downtown Brooklyn
National Register of Historic Places in Brooklyn
New York City Designated Landmarks in Brooklyn